Edward Solon Hagedorn (born October 12, 1946) is a Filipino politician and former Mayor of Puerto Princesa City. He was first elected mayor of Puerto Princesa in May 1992, when the city was still the capital and a component city of the island province of Palawan. In 2007, Puerto Princesa was declared a highly urbanized city and became independent of the province. He ran for senator in the 2013 election but lost.

Hagedorn's leadership was directed towards establishing a harmony between the environment and development. The mayor was credited with establishing the City of Puerto Princesa as a model of eco-tourism for the country.

Early life and career

Edward Solon Hagedorn was born in the municipality of Parañaque, then under Rizal Province on October 12, 1946, to Alexander Hagedorn and the former Gliceria Solon. He married Maria Elena Marcelo and the couple has two children, Eva Christie and Elroy John.

Hagedorn completed his education from St. Andrew's School (Parañaque), San Sebastian College - Recoletos and from the University of the East in the City of Manila.

When Hagedorn was elected as Mayor of Puerto Princesa City in 1992, he also served as an Assemblyman of the Southern Philippines Council for Peace and Development (SPCD), a body created during the term of President Corazon C. Aquino which was tasked to oversee the establishment of an autonomous region for Muslims in Mindanao and it included Palawan island.

He also served simultaneously as mayor and as a Representative of the League of Cities of the Philippines for Region IV and member of National Executive Board of Boy Scout of the Philippines.

Under his leadership, Puerto Princesa gained popularity as one of the more famous eco-tourism destinations in the Philippines and as a global model for environment protection. The recognition earned the city a place in the Hall of Fame. During his multiple terms, the city was awarded as the "cleanest and greenest" component city.

Based on the Constitution of the Philippines, Hagedorn was forbidden from running for a third three-year term on January 30, 2001, but after an election recall led by Puerto Princesa's barangay leaders against the incumbent mayor who replaced Hagedorn, Victorino Dennis M. Socrates, the Supreme Court of the Philippines on November 12, 2002, issued a landmark decision enabling Hagedorn to run again as mayor of the city.

In September 2005, Hagedorn was appointed by President Gloria Macapagal Arroyo as the "anti-jueteng czar" to handle the government's  program against the proliferation of the illegal two-numbers gambling. He created a legalized and government form of jueteng called Small Town Lottery or STL.

Leadership Initiatives

Oplan Linis Program (Clean and Green Campaign) - Launched on August 1, 1992, the program aims to sustain cleanliness, beautification, and sanitation in the city through active and continuing partnerships among government agencies, non-government organizations, the private sector, and citizens. The program has earned Puerto Princesa the coveted label of being the cleanest and greenest city in the Philippines.
Bantay Puerto Program (Puerto Princesa Watch) - Protect + Rehabilitate + Plan - These are the program's key management thrusts. Protect what is there, rehabilitate what has been destroyed, and plan for the intelligent utilization of the city's terrestrial and marine resources. This is the life cycle that the program envisions for the community to achieve sustainable development.
Comprehensive Housing Program - Puerto Princesa's vast land area and its rich terrestrial and marine resources have become like magnets that attracted a lot of in-migration from all over the country. They came in droves and squatted in public and private lands whose owners either did not care or know. Majority of them, being fishermen, chose the coastal areas for being closest to their source of income.
Agriculture Program - Puerto Princesa City is primarily an agricultural economy. It is almost self-sufficient in food, except for a few varieties of vegetables. Metro Manila's ten million population get their fish and other marine supplies from the city in particular and Palawan in general. To improve the farmer's quality of life, however, there exists the urgent need to introduce productivity enhancement programs.
Education Program - The project intends to improve the standard of education within the service area of the city government by identifying and prioritizing the establishment of schools, and organizing a continuous training scheme for schoolteachers in the city.
Health Program – the City Government has undertaken effective and efficient health services.
Infrastructure Program – this refers to both horizontal and vertical constructions, implemented with the ultimate goal of boosting the economic development of the city, at the least possible cost.
Livelihood Program – “Kaunlaran” (Development) or economic development is the last of the three K's (the first two being “Kalinisan” or cleanliness and “Kapayapaan” or peace and order). The last was the most difficult but was achieved, making Puerto Princesa City one of the safest destinations in the Philippines.
Tourism Program - Puerto Princesa City was a former unknown but now has become a city that balances tourism with nature, i.e., a city in a forest.
E-tricycle - On January 19, 2007, Puerto Princesa Mayor Edward S. Hagedorn unveiled the environment-friendly and economical electric-powered “Trikebayan” (which does not emit any noise or carbon monoxide) at the Kapihan sa Sulo forum, Sulo Hotel, Quezon City. The Trikebayan costs only P 48 or $1.20 per day to operate, while a gasoline-powered tricycle operation would cost P 200. Rolly Concepcion, who conceptualized the Trikebayan, said that converting a tricycle engine to electric costs P 68,000. The 36-watt rechargeable battery under the passenger seat can run for 12 hours.

In popular culture
 Hagedorn was the subject of a biopic movie titled Hagedorn in which his character was played by actor Fernando Poe Jr. in 1995.

See also
Philippines
History of the Philippines
Palawan
Puerto Princesa

External links
Official website
A Lifelong Journey of Dedication and Service
Visit Puerto Princesa

References

1946 births
Filipino people of German descent
Living people
Mayors of places in Palawan
Lakas–CMD (1991) politicians
People from Parañaque
People from Puerto Princesa
Independent politicians in the Philippines
San Sebastian College – Recoletos alumni
University of the East alumni